Changshu Christian Church is a Protestant church located in Changshu, Jiangsu, China.

History
Changshu Christian Church was built in 1902, during late Qing dynasty (1644–1911). In 1937, American Pastor Smith designed the buildings and was completed in 1948. In May 2005, it was designated as a "Municipality Protected Historic Site" by Changshu government.

Gallery

References

Further reading
 

Churches in Jiangsu
Tourist attractions in Wuxi
1995 establishments in China
Protestant churches in China
Churches completed in 1995